Holton cum Beckering is a small village and civil parish in West Lindsey, Lincolnshire, England. At the 2001 Census it had a population of 140.

History
Around the village is evidence of Medieval settlement, defined by cropmarks and ridge and furrow earthworks indicating crofts and enclosures. Near Holton Hall are possible remains of a moat.

Landmarks
All Saints' Church is a Grade I listed Anglican church. Kelly's mentions that it comprises a chancel, nave, aisles and south porch, and a square tower containing three bells, with the chancel incorporating richly painted frescoes and a carved oak screen separating the chancel from the nave. Benches were carved by a Mr Swaby of Marsh Chapel when the chancel was rebuilt in 1851 by a Mr Nicholson of Lincoln. The church was restored in 1859-60 and 1870-74 by George Gilbert Scott, who rebuilt the north arcade and added, according to Pevsner,  a "glittering mosaic reredos... made, according to Canon Binnal, by a Catholic Italian who insisted on smoking his pipe while doing it". Also noted was a chalice and paten cover dated 1569 Scott also repaired both aisles, and rebuilt a mortuary chapel and the whole roof.

Other listed buildings are early 18th-century Holton Hall and late 17th-century Abbey Farm House.

Culture
The amateur dramatic society was originally known as the Holton Players. Following a move to Wickenby, in 1970, they were renamed the Lindsey Rural Players.

Academy Award-winning actor Jim Broadbent was born in the village in 1949; his parents, Roy and Dee Broadbent, were founder members of the Holton Players.

BBC documentaries
The village was the subject of a BBC Radio 4 documentary Conchies of Holton-Cum-Beckering on 7 May 2007. Presented by Billy Bragg, it interviewed the surviving members of a group of Second World War conscientious objectors who formed themselves into farming communities and an amateur dramatic society.

A documentary on BBC Radio 4 Extra The Holton Players was broadcast on 1 September 2014 (and repeated on 21 June 2017). It was presented by Jim Broadbent.

References

External links

 "Holton Beckering", Genuki.org.uk. Retrieved 29 October 2011

Villages in Lincolnshire
Civil parishes in Lincolnshire
West Lindsey District